KNRG is a terrestrial American radio station airing an Americana format licensed to New Ulm, Texas, and broadcasting on 92.3 MHz FM.  The station is owned by Roy E. Henderson.

History
KNRG was issued its initial License to Cover on November 4, 1999. The facility's transmission tower is located near Farm to Market Road 2981 and Laird Rd., northeast of La Grange, Texas.

References

External links

NRG
Americana radio stations